Dustin Kyle Ingram (born January 25, 1990) is an American actor and musician. He is best known for his role as Bert in the 2016 remake of Cabin Fever, as Duane Ogilvy in Nickelodeon's Unfabulous, and as Agent Petey in HBO's Watchmen.

Early life and career
Ingram was born in Riverside County, California to Randy and Cindy (née Johnson) Ingram. The child of two actors, Ingram developed an early appreciation for theater and production. Ingram had his first role at the age of 6  in a production of Joseph and the Amazing Technicolor Dreamcoat.

After his time in theater, Ingram sought a career in film and television, saying that he asked himself the question, “What would it be like to strive for complete and ultimate truth in a performance rather than making sure the people in the back row of a 3,000 seat theater knew what you were feeling?”. At 15, he landed his first major role as Duane Oglivy in Unfabulous (2004-2007).

In 2016, Ingram starred in a remake of Cabin Fever, a 2002 horror film directed, written, and produced by Eli Roth who also produced the remake.

In 2019, Ingram was cast in Watchmen, a TV series based on the DC Comics limited series of the same name.

Despite his current focus on television and film, Ingram continues to occasionally star in plays. In 2012, he portrayed the lead role of Jared in Annie Baker's Barrymore Award-winning Body Awareness.

Ingram is also a musician, leading the "one-man band" Gypzïrafe.

Filmography

Film

Television

References

External links
 
 

1990 births
Living people
American male television actors
American male stage actors
American male musicians